Muhammad Azhar Khan Jadoon (both 3 April 1960) is a Pakistani politician who served as a member of the National Assembly of Pakistan from June 2013 to May 2018.

Early life
Jadoon was born on 3 April 1960.

Political career

Jadoon ran for the seat of the National Assembly of Pakistan as an independent candidate from Constituency NA-17 (Abbottabad-I) in 2002 Pakistani general election but was unsuccessful. He received 30,949 votes and lost the seat to Amanullah Khan Jadoon.

Jadoon ran for the seat of National Assembly as an independent candidate from Constituency NA-17 (Abbottabad-I) in 2008 Pakistani general election but was unsuccessful. He received 36,668 votes and lost the seat to Sardar Mehtab Abbasi.

Jadoon was elected to the National Assembly as a candidate of Pakistan Tehreek-e-Insaf from Constituency NA-17 (Abbottabad-I) in 2013 Pakistani general election. He received 96,549 votes and defeated Sardar Mehtab Abbasi.

References

Living people
Pakistan Tehreek-e-Insaf politicians
Pashtun people
People from Abbottabad District
Pakistani MNAs 2013–2018
1960 births